Super Squadron is a role-playing game published by Adventure Simulations (Australia) in 1983.

Description
Super Squadron is a superhero role-playing game system. The "Rule Book" (60 pages) covers character creation and descriptions of over 75 powers, magic spells, artifacts, encounters, world background, and romantic involvements. The "Adventure Book" (24 pages) includes 10 miniscenarios of gradually increasing complexity that teach the GM and player how to play. The game comes with a character record sheet pamphlet.

Publication history
Super Squadron was designed by Joseph Italiano and published by Adventure Simulations in 1983 as a 60-page book, and a 24 page book of brief introductory adventures.

The second edition was published in 1984 as a boxed set including a 60-page book, the 24 page introductory adventures book, character sheets, and a pamphlet of character outlines to be customised to represent players characters.

The Tome, published April 1985, was a 54 page book of 10 longer fleshed out adventures, large amounts of NPCs, new and revised skills and powers.

Super Science, published June 1986, was the final supplement with expanded rules on powers, vehicles and running a space campaign. It included a statistics system for plents and civilisations, a large double sided galaxy scale map.

Reception
William A. Barton reviewed Super Squadron in Space Gamer No. 73. Barton commented that "If you have no qualms about random power generation [...] Super Squadron is definitely a game you should check out. Even if you don't wish to switch from Champions, Superworld, or V&V, SS has a lot of source material [...] you'll find useful."

Reviews
Multiverse (Issue 4 - Winter 1985)
Game News (Issue 3 - May 1985)

References

Australian role-playing games
Role-playing games introduced in 1983
Superhero role-playing games